Gastrolactarius is a genus of gasteroid fungi in the family Russulaceae . Although currently valid, this taxon is very likely a synonym of Lactarius.

Species

References

Russulales
Russulales genera